Human Relations is a monthly peer-reviewed academic journal covering research on social relationships in work-related settings. The journal is published by SAGE Publications on behalf of the Tavistock Institute of Human Relations (London). The journal was established in 1947 by the Tavistock Institute and the Research Center for Group Dynamics at the Massachusetts Institute of Technology.

Abstracting and indexing  
According to the Journal Citation Reports, the journal has a 2017 impact factor of  3.043, ranking it 4th out of 98 journals in the category "Social Sciences, Interdisciplinary" and 55th out of 902 journals in the category "Management".

References

External links  
 
 Human Relationship

Business and management journals
Human resource management journals
SAGE Publishing academic journals
Monthly journals
Publications established in 1947
English-language journals